Gonezie Marie Josée Dominique Ta Lou (born 18 November 1988) is an Ivorian sprinter competing in the 100 metres and 200 m. She finished fourth in the 100 metres and 200 metres finals at the 2016 Olympic Games, missing out on a medal in the 100m by seven-thousandths of a second (0.007). She then won silver medals in the 100 metres and 200 metres at the 2017 World Championships, the latter in the national record time of 22.08 secs. Her 100 metres best is 10.72 secs (2022), thus making her the African record holder.

Career

Early career: 2007–2009
Ta Lou first trained in association football and was convinced to change to sprint by her elder brother in 2008. She was voted the 2015 African Athlete of the Year by the Association of National Olympic Committees of Africa. She trained in Paris, France, and studied medicine at the Université d'Abobo-Adjamé in Abidjan.

Ta Lou's original sporting passion was football. She played at school, in the neighbourhood of Koumassi, a suburb of Abidjan. Her brother objected when a women's team tried to get her to join them, fearing that she would turn into a tomboy. Friends of his suggested that if his sister enjoyed sports, she should take up athletics, as she was already regularly beating the boys in her class in sprints. By coincidence, Florence Olonade, the Ivory Coast 100 m champion in 1988, was a classmate of Ta Lou's mother, and invited Ta Lou for a trial. She beat the girls who trained under Olonade in a 200 m race, even though she was running barefoot and had not had time to prepare.

Originally, she could not train regularly, as she had to study for her high school diploma. Her mother was also against it, because she believed there was too much uncertainty in sport, particularly women's sport. She wanted Marie-Josée to become a doctor.

Ta Lou quickly progressed onto the national team.

By the end of June 2007 she was part of the Ivorian 4 × 100 m team that won bronze at the West African Championships in Cotonou, Benin.  She then made the Ivorian team for the African Junior Championships in Ouagadougou, Burkina Faso. She finished last in her 100 m heat, with a time of 13.21 seconds. In September 2007, she won her first national 100 m title in a time of 12.9 seconds.

Ta Lou began studying medicine after finishing high school. In 2008, she won both the 100 m and 200 m at the national championships. She repeated this feat at the 2009 National Championships. That year, she finished seventh in the 200 m at the 2009 West African Championships in Porto-Novo, Benin, with a time of 25.67 despite a 1.8 m/s headwind. Because it was hard to combine athletics training with medical school, she switched to accounting and finance. Her coach, Florence Onolade, also made a sacrifice, sending the promising young athlete to a coach with more experience, Jeannot Kouamé, so that Ta Lou could progress further.

Early rise: 2010–2013
In 2010, Ta Lou made her first impact on the international scene, finishing second place in the 100 m at the international Gabriel Tiacoh meet in Abidjan in a time of 12.10 seconds. In June 2010, she again won both the 100 m and 200 m at the national championships. She then competed in her first senior African Championships, finishing sixth in her 100 m semi-final in a time of 12.16 seconds. She also ran in the 200 m heats.  At the end of that summer, she was awarded a 4-year sports scholarship in China, by the Ivory Coach Athletics Federation. Her coach, Jeannot Kouamé, had pushed her to apply for the scholarship, as he could see her potential but felt she could not fulfill it if she stayed in the Ivory Coast.

Ta Lou and national teammate Wilfried Koffi (who would become double African champion in the 100 m and 200 m in 2014) moved to Shanghai at the end of the summer. Unfortunately, the scholarship was unsuccessful because the course she wished to attend, physiotherapy, was not offered to foreign students and the only course that was offered to the scholarship students was Mandarin. Foreign athletes were also only allowed to take part in the early rounds of athletics competitions.

In 2011, in August, she took part in the World University Games in Shenzhen, China, in both the 100 m and 200 m. She lowered her personal bests to 11.87 seconds and 24.17 seconds respectively. She was also a double finalist at the All-Africa Games in Mozambique. She also set a new 100 m personal best of 11.56 seconds in the heats.

In 2012, she won a bronze at the African Championships in Porto-Novo, Benin in the 200m (23.44) and in the 4 × 100 m.  She was also fourth in the individual 100 m. She set a new personal best in the semi-final, 23.26 seconds. This also meant she had achieved the B standard for the Olympic Games. She was included in the Ivorian team but was displaced when Murielle Ahouré got a time that met the A qualifying standard.

International competitions: 2013–2015
In 2013 she won the 100 and 200 m at the Gabriel Tiacoh meet in front of a home crowd in Abidjan. She competed in the World University Games in Kazan in July, reaching the semi-final in the 100 m and finishing eighth in the final of the 200 m in a time of 23.63. Her season was affected by a bout of malaria, which meant her time of 11.58 set at the Gabriel Tiacoh meet would remain her season's best. She was also struggling to combine her athletics training and her studies in Shanghai so in August, she decided to return to Ivory Coast.

Her ex-coaches, Onolade and Kouamé helped her to try to enrol at one of the West African High Performance Training Centres in Lomé (Togo) or Dakar (Senegal). She was put on the waiting list for sprinters. A space opened up in the autumn when one athlete decided not to take up their place in Senegal.  The head sprints coach at the Dakar HPTC, Anthony Koffi, Amantle Montsho's coach, pushed for Ta Lou to be the replacement. Ta Lou got her place in December 2013.

The new training produced immediate results. At the Gabriel Tiacoh meet, her first race against Ahouré since she moved, she finished second with a new personal best of 11.24 seconds. She also won the 200m in a time of 23.43. She also signed with a French club (Paris' Stade Français) so she could compete on the French athletics circuit. In August 2013 she competed at the African Championships in August in Marrakech. In the 100 m she clinched bronze in 11.20 and, in the absence of Blessing Okagbare, she finished second in the 200m, breaking her personal best with a time of 22.87 seconds, her first run under 23 seconds.  She won another silver with the 4 × 100 m relay.

Due to her results, she was selected for the African team at the IAAF Continental Cup in September, where she finished fourth in the 100 m in 11.28 and fifth in the 200 m in 22.78, another personal best.

Following further good performances in 2014, she was awarded an Olympic Solidarity scholarship to prepare for the 2016 Olympic Games. She also got an agent, the Italian Federico Rosa, who helped get her places on the starting line at international events. This meant she was able to take part in more events in 2015, to prepare for the World Championships that year. She ran a new 100 m personal best 11.08 m (wind-assisted) winning the Dakar World Challenge in May 2015. She improved that time to 11.06 seconds at the Paris Diamond League meeting on the 4th of July, her first Diamond League entry.  She ran below 23 seconds three times in 2015.  Her coach set a target of reaching the semi-finals at the World Championship. She succeeded, and barely missed making a final, because she was 3rd in her semi-final in both the 100 m and 200 m. She also set a new personal best in the 100 m of 11.04. She set a time of 10.95 in her heat but that was over the wind-assistance limit. In the 200 m, she lowered her personal best to 22.73 to win her heat, even though she was running with spikes borrowed from her friend Cynthia Bolingo. She ran even faster in her semi-final, 22.56, but it was unfortunately three hundredths of a second short of qualifying for the final.

At the African Games that year, she won a sprint double, with impressive times to offset the absence of both Blessing Okagbare and Murielle Ahouré.  In the 100 m, she ran a new personal best with a new Games record time of 11.02. She was named Best Female Athlete of the All-Africa Games and honoured at the ANOC Awards in Washington in November.

She competed at the 2016 World Indoor Championships. She reached the final but a poor start in the final led to worst 60 m time of the whole season. She was then injured at the Doha Diamond League meeting, hurting her left hamstring and being carried off the track by her opponents. The injury prevented her from training for a month. She made her competitive return at the Birmingham Diamond League on 5 June.

In Durban at the African Championships, she claimed two bronze medals. One was in the 100 m (behind countrywoman Murielle Ahouré and South Africa's Carina Horn) and the other in the 4 × 100 m, before beating South Africa's Alyssa Conley by 0.03 to win the African title in the 200 m. Later, she was part of the Ivorian team that set a new 4 × 100 m record of 43.28 seconds in Cape Coast, Ghana.

She false started in the 100 m at the Monaco Diamond League on 15 July. The London Diamond League went much better for Ta Lou, because she ran 10.96, in to headwinds, twice to win the 100 m.

Worldwide success: 2016–present
She also performed very well at the Rio Olympics. She reached both finals and finished 4th both in the 100 m and 200 m.  Her runs included a new personal best of 10.94 in the 100 m semi-final. that the achievement originally tasted like a huge disappointment. She set a new PB of 10.94 to qualify to the 100m final with the 7th time. Ta Lou finished with the same time as Shelly-Anne Fraser-Pryce in the 100 m final down to the hundredth of the second and the Ivorian lost the bronze in a photo-finish by 0.007, 10.852 to 10.859.

In the 200m, she ran 0.5 seconds faster than her previous season's best, winning her heat in a new personal best of 22.31 despite suffering from flu. She went faster again in the semi-final with a time of 22.28. In the final, she set a new national record, with a time of 22.21, 0.03 seconds faster than Murielle Ahouré's previous national record.

2017 did not get off to a good start for Ta Lou as she had been ill for most of the winter. After the indoor season, she made up for her lack of training in the outdoor season, setting a new national record in the 200m, 22.16, in Lausanne on 6 July. She then won the Monaco Diamond League 200 m.

She then travelled back home to Abidjan to anchor the 4 × 100 m relay in the Francophone Games. This was the host countries first gold in that competition. At the 2017 World Championships, she won the silver in the 100 m, narrowly missing out on gold, having led for most of the race. She then followed this up with another silver medal in the 200M, setting a new National Record of 22.08 in the process.

International competitions

See also
 2018 in 100 metres

References

External links

1988 births
Living people
Ivorian female sprinters
Ivorian expatriate sportspeople in France
Olympic athletes of Ivory Coast
World Athletics Championships athletes for Ivory Coast
Athletes (track and field) at the 2015 African Games
Athletes (track and field) at the 2019 African Games
Athletes (track and field) at the 2016 Summer Olympics
African Games medalists in athletics (track and field)
African Games gold medalists for Ivory Coast
African Games bronze medalists for Ivory Coast
World Athletics Championships medalists
World Athletics Indoor Championships medalists
African Championships in Athletics winners
IAAF Continental Cup winners
African Games gold medalists in athletics (track and field)
People from Sassandra-Marahoué District
Athletes (track and field) at the 2020 Summer Olympics
Olympic female sprinters